Jeremiah is an American-Canadian post-apocalyptic action drama television series starring Luke Perry and Malcolm-Jamal Warner that ran on the Showtime network from 2002 to 2004. The series takes place in a future wherein the adult population has been wiped out by a deadly virus.

The series ended production in 2003, after the management of Showtime decided they were not interested in producing science fiction programming anymore. Had the series continued, it would have run under a different showrunner than J. Michael Straczynski, who decided to leave following the completion of the production of the second season due to creative differences between him and MGM Television.

Episodes for the final half of the second season did not begin airing in the United States until September 3, 2004.

Plot
The year is 2021, 15 years after a plague has killed nearly everyone over the age of thirteen (both the event and the virus itself are referred to as "The Big Death" and "The Big D"). Two young men, Jeremiah and Kurdy, meet up and join forces with those inside "Thunder Mountain" and help rebuild civilization. Jeremiah is searching for the "Valhalla Sector" where his father may still be alive.

The eponymous Jeremiah is a semi-loner who has spent the last 15 years travelling back and forth across the United States, seeking out a living and looking for a place called "Valhalla Sector" (the remains of Raven Rock), which his father—a viral researcher—had mentioned to Jeremiah as a possible refuge shortly before disappearing into the chaos of "the Big Death."  A stop in the Colorado trading town of Clarefield results in Jeremiah teaming up with another lone traveller named Kurdy, before being imprisoned by the town's warlord in a cell with a man named Simon, who wants to recruit Jeremiah for a vague and mysterious organization. With Kurdy's help, Jeremiah and Simon escape, but Simon is fatally wounded in the process.

Following the instructions given to them by the dying Simon, Jeremiah and Kurdy take Simon's truck back to "Thunder Mountain," the remains of the NORAD complex, where they discover a well-organized and -equipped group operating out of the base, led by the former child prodigy Markus Alexander. Markus chooses to employ Jeremiah and Kurdy as a recon team to replace the now dead Simon and his partner, sending the two men back outside to gather information in preparation for the time when the mountain will need to start rebuilding the world.

Over the course of the first season, the group increasingly encounters threats originating from Valhalla Sector, which they discover to be a sealed and heavily armed bunker complex in West Virginia, used to house the remains of the US government and military leadership during the Big Death. The survivors there plan to rebuild the world in an authoritarian mold, combining their military power with attempts to control the "Big Death" virus itself in order to wipe out resistance by slaughtering non-compliant populations. The second half of Season 1 primarily deals with the efforts of Jeremiah and Thunder Mountain to stop Valhalla Sector.

After the final defeat of Valhalla Sector in the opening episodes of Season 2, a new threat emerges in the form of a crusading army from the East, led by a mysterious prophetic figure known as Daniel. Season 2 deals with the impending conflict between the unifying survivor communities under Thunder Mountain, and the advancing Army of Daniel.

Although a third season was considered, series creator J. Michael Straczynski made it clear that if the show ran a further season he would have nothing to do with it. The show concluded with the end of the second season resolving most plot threads.

Cast
Most of the characters are survivors of the virus who are now in their late twenties or younger.

Production

Development
Developed by Babylon 5 creator J. Michael Straczynski and executive produced by Straczynski and Sam Egan in the first season, and Straczynski and Grant Rosenberg in the second, the series is loosely based on Belgian writer Hermann Huppen's comic book series, Jeremiah, which began in 1979. Aside from the names of the two main characters, the general personality of the protagonist, and the post-apocalyptic setting, there are no similarities between the comics and the series. Having previously published black and white English translations of the first three volumes under the Adventure Comics imprint of Malibu in 1991, Scott Mitchell Rosenberg, the CEO of Platinum Studios (a company that specializes in comics-to-film properties translations), acquired the media rights to the books and developed a television series.  Executive Producer J. Michael Straczynski stated it was a "road show" with Jeremiah and Kurdy traveling around the country in a military Jeep.

Shooting began in Vancouver, British Columbia in the fall of 2001. Actors Luke Perry, from Beverly Hills 90210, and Malcolm Jamal-Warner, from The Cosby Show, were cast in the leads.

Filming
The series was filmed in Vancouver, British Columbia, Canada.

Locations

Cancellation
Straczynski had prepared a five-year series. But a change in personnel in Showtime's administration caused the network to decide to stop producing science fiction programming and unofficially cancel Jeremiah before the second season had its debut in November 2003. Fans realized the possibility of cancellation when Showtime announced the airing of only the first seven out of fifteen episodes of the second season, and organized a campaign to write and phone executives at Showtime, MGM and Platinum Studios to convince them to show the remaining eight and continue with a third season. Ultimately, the network began airing the remaining of the second season starting on September 3, 2004 - after a ten-month break since the last aired episode - but despite continuously rising ratings did not proceed with the renewal of the show.

Before season 2 premiered, Straczynski vowed to never work with the then-current administration of MGM Television after experiencing major creative differences with them, and had there been a third season it would have to run under some new showrunner. Everyone on cast and crew, including Grant Rosenberg, the second season's co-executive producer, were willing to have continued.

Episodes

Home media
In January 2004, MGM Home Entertainment released season 1 of Jeremiah on DVD. Season 2 was released on DVD as a "burn on demand" from Amazon (available to US and Canadian addresses only) in March 2010. The series episodes are also available as digital purchases on Amazon, Hulu and iTunes (season 2 only).

In other media

RPGs
After having been designed by Morrigan Press, Mongoose Publishing published Jeremiah: The Roleplaying Game in 2005.

References

External links
 Alternative Website
 
 JMS briefly comments on Jeremiah on Republibot
 

2002 American television series debuts
2002 Canadian television series debuts
2004 American television series endings
2004 Canadian television series endings
2000s American science fiction television series
2000s Canadian science fiction television series
Fiction set in 2021
Television series set in the 2020s
American action television series
2000s American drama television series
Post-apocalyptic television series
Television series by MGM Television
Television series based on Belgian comics
Television series by Lionsgate Television
Television series created by J. Michael Straczynski
Serial drama television series
Showtime (TV network) original programming
English-language television shows
Television shows set in Colorado
Television series about viral outbreaks
Television shows filmed in Vancouver